Nicholas Tarrier, FBA, FBPsS (born 1 May 1951) is a psychologist and academic. He was Professor of Clinical Psychology at the University of Manchester from 1991 to 2011, and Professor of Clinical Psychology and eHealth Studies at King's College London from 2011 to 2014.

Career 
Born on 1 May 1951, Nicholas Tarrier completed his undergraduate studies at the University of Nottingham, graduating in 1972. The following year, he graduated from the University of Sussex with a master's degree in experimental psychology. He then completed his doctorate at the Institute of Psychiatry; his PhD was awarded in 1977 for his thesis "Measures of arousal in Schizophrenic patients in relation to their social environment". He then spent two years as Professor of Psychology at the Federal University of Paraíba, before training as a clinical psychiatrist at the University of Manchester; after receiving a master's degree in the discipline in 1981, he spent eight years as a clinical psychologist at University of Salford. He then spent two years lecturing at the University of Sydney, before joining the University of Manchester as Professor of Clinical Psychology; in 2011, he was appointed Professor of Clinical Psychology and eHealth Studies at King's College London, before retiring in 2014 (he then became an emeritus professor at Manchester).

According to his British Academy profile, Tarrier's research focuses on "the understanding of psychological and psychosocial mechanisms underlying mental disorders, particularly schizophrenia, psychoses and post-traumatic stress and the development and evaluation of psychological treatments to improve outcomes".

Awards and honours 
In 1989, Tarrier was elected a Fellow of the British Psychological Society. In 2015, he was also elected a Fellow of the British Academy, the United Kingdom's national academy for the humanities and social sciences.

References 

1951 births
Living people
Alumni of the University of Sussex
Fellows of the British Academy
British psychologists
Clinical psychologists
Academics of the University of Manchester
Academics of King's College London